Andrew Scott Malone is an American college baseball coach and former first baseman. Malone is the head coach of the Texas A&M–Corpus Christi Islanders baseball team.

Playing career
Malone attended Cooper High School in Abilene, Texas. Malone played for the school's varsity baseball team under the direction of his father, Andy. Malone then enrolled at the Texas Christian University (TCU), to play college baseball for the TCU Horned Frogs baseball team.

As a freshman at Texas Christian University in 1990, Malone had a .358 batting average, a .408 on-base percentage (OBP) and a .516 SLG. He was one of the Southwest Conference's best hitters.

In the 1992 season as a junior, Malone hit 7 home runs and 17 doubles.

In 2012, Malone was elected into the Texas Christian University Athletics Hall of Fame.

Coaching career
On July 23, 2004, Malone was named an assistant coach at UNLV.

On July 2, 2007, Malone was named the head coach of the Texas A&M–Corpus Christi Islanders baseball program.

Head coaching record

See also
 List of current NCAA Division I baseball coaches

References

External links

Texas A&M–Corpus Christi Islanders bio

1971 births
Living people
Baseball first basemen
Baseball outfielders
TCU Horned Frogs baseball players
Butte Copper Kings players
Charleston Rainbows players
Charlotte Rangers players
Abilene Prairie Dogs players
McMurry War Hawks baseball coaches
TCU Horned Frogs baseball coaches
Kentucky Wildcats baseball coaches
UTSA Roadrunners baseball coaches
UT Arlington Mavericks baseball coaches
UNLV Rebels baseball coaches
Texas A&M–Corpus Christi Islanders baseball coaches
McMurry University alumni